Agnes (originally Agnes River) was a railway station on the South Gippsland line in South Gippsland, Victoria. The station was opened during the 1890s it operated under the name Agnes until the 1960s. It was then renamed Barry Beach Junction, after the opening of the line to Barry Beach servicing the oil fields in Bass Strait.

Disused railway stations in Victoria (Australia)
Transport in Gippsland (region)
Shire of South Gippsland